Koloni is a village and administrative centre (chef-lieu) of the commune of Niantaga in the Cercle of Koutiala in the Sikasso Region of southern Mali. The village is 45 km north-northeast of Koutiala.

The French explorer René Caillié stopped at Koloni on 21 February 1828 on his journey to Timbuktu. He was travelling with a caravan transporting kola nuts to Djenné. In his book Travels through Central Africa to Timbuctoo published in 1830 he wrote:
At ten in the morning we arrived at Coloni, a little village situated in a beautiful, fertile and well cultivated plain, surrounded by a great number of large bombases. ... The village of Coloni, which is surrounded by two mud walls, contains a population of about four hundred, consisting of Foulahs, Bambaras, and Mandingoes: it is shaded by large mimosas and some bombaces.

References

Sources

.

Populated places in Sikasso Region